Red Bluff Creek may refer to:

Red Bluff Creek (Satilla River tributary), a stream in Georgia
Red Bluff Creek (Medina River tributary), a stream in Texas